Damme is a city and municipality located in the Belgian province of West Flanders, six kilometres northeast of Brugge (Bruges). On 1 January 2006, the municipality had a population of 10,899. The total area is 89.52 km2, giving a population density of 122 inhabitants per km2.

In the 13th century, Damme was the port for Bruges, to which it was linked by the river Reie. The river has now been canalised into the long, straight, treelined and picturesque Damse Vaart, which continues across the Dutch border to Sluis. The line of the town's star-shaped fortifications can still be traced by lines of tall poplar trees and in places by a moat. It was the site of the Battle of Damme, fought on 30 and 31 May 1213, when an English fleet under the Earl of Salisbury captured scores of French ships and their cargo of gold, silver, wine and other victuals.

Well-known Damme inhabitants include Jacob van Maerlant, a medieval poet and the town clerk of Damme until his death in around 1300, and Karel Verleye, co-founder of the Bruges College of Europe, who died in Damme in 2002.

Tourism 

Today, Damme is a popular side trip for tourists who are visiting Bruges and is a popular venue for eating out, and a destination for boat trips. Damme has more recently become known as a book town, with numerous bookshops and regular book fairs.

The most popular ways of traveling to Damme are by canal boat that runs during the summer high season or all year round by bus or bicycle. The bicycle route is along the canal path taking the same route that the canal boat takes.

Maps

References

External links

 
Municipalities of West Flanders